Up on the Roof is a musical by Simon Moore and Jane Prowse, which follows a decade in the lives of five friends who form an a cappella singing group at university.

The show was first staged in 1987 in London and starred Mark McGann and Gary Olsen, and it was nominated for an Olivier Award for Best Musical and McGann and Olsen were nominated for best actor in a musical. It was revived at the Queen's Theatre, Hornchurch in May and June 2006.

The show was made into a film in 1997 starring Adrian Lester.

External links
 

1987 musicals
British musicals